Captain Humberto Viola (1943 – December 1, 1974 in San Miguel de Tucumán) was an Argentine military, who was assassinated in 1974, along with his 3 year-old daughter María Cristina, by the People's Revolutionary Army guerrilla organization.

Captain Humberto Viola was featured in the province of Tucuman where he worked in intelligence on the orders of General Luciano Benjamín Menéndez.

Viola was killed while arriving with his car at his parents home along with his wife María Cristina Picon and his two small daughters María Cristina of 3 years and María Fernanda of 5 years. His daughter María Cristina was also killed while his daughter María Fernanda was seriously injured.

References

1943 births
1974 deaths
People murdered in Argentina
Deaths by firearm in Argentina
Terrorism deaths in Argentina